Eugeniu Stătescu (December 25, 1836 – December 30, 1905) was a Romanian politician who served as the Minister of Internal Affairs from April 10, 1881 until June 8, 1881 and as Minister of Foreign Affairs from June 9, 1881 until July 30, 1881 during the existence of the United Principalities. He was one of the signatories of the Act of Proclamation of the Kingdom of Romania signed by King Carol I and Queen Elisaveta.

See also
 Foreign relations of Romania

1836 births
1905 deaths
Politicians from Bucharest
People of the Principality of Wallachia
National Liberal Party (Romania) politicians
Romanian Ministers of Foreign Affairs
Romanian Ministers of Interior
Romanian Ministers of Justice
Presidents of the Senate of Romania